Stepanenko (Ukrainian or Russian: Степаненко) is a gender-neutral Ukrainian surname. It may refer to:
Anatoly Stepanenko (born 1949), Soviet cyclist 
Ekaterina Stepanenko (born 1983), Russian football player
Eugene Stepanenko (born 1974), Ukrainian director
Galina Stepanenko (born 1966), Russian ballerina
Ivan Stepanenko (1920–2007), Soviet-Ukrainian flying ace
Ivan Stepanenko (ice hockey), (born 1995), Kazakhstani ice hockey player
Julija Stepanenko (born 1977), Latvian politician
Nikolay Stepanenko (born 1956), Soviet-Belarusian sprint canoeist
Oleg Stepanenko (born 1939), Soviet-Ukrainian hurdler
Oleh Stepanenko (born 2004), Ukrainian footballer
Sergei Stepanenko (born 1981), Kazakh/Russian footballer
Taras Stepanenko (born 1989), Ukrainian football player
Vjačeslavs Stepaņenko (born 1959), Latvian politician
Yelena Stepanenko (born 1953), Russian actress

See also
 

Ukrainian-language surnames
Patronymic surnames
Surnames from given names